The 1955 Kentucky Derby was the 81st running of the Kentucky Derby. The race took place on May 7, 1955. The race carried a purse of $152,500 of which winner Swaps received $108,400, a then record.

Winner of the Kentucky Derby 
Swaps was a California bred American thoroughbred racehorse. Swap's became the first "All-California" colt to win the Kentucky Derby. Known as the "California Comet", this not being the only nickname he had many other nicknames. His second most popular one was the "California Cripple." This name was given because of how many injuries he had and still ended up winning the Kentucky derby.

Trainer of Swaps' 
Swap's was trained by Meshach (Mesh) Tenney. Tenney was born on November 16, 1907 and worked with Swaps. Swaps then ended up winning the title of United States Horse of the Year in 1956 with the assistance of Mesh Tenney. Mesh Tenney was known for the night before the 1955 Kentucky Derby because he slept in Swap's stall.

Race Description 
The 2-year-old champion (Nashua) and Swaps were some of the biggest competitors and "brought one of the biggest East-West showdowns in Derby history." (Courier journal) Swaps established a steady pace for the beginning of the race, Eddie Arcaro and Nashua started to stalk in the third and moved on the outside of Swaps. Swaps ended up speeding up and winning for the  length. Swaps covered the last-quarter mile with the time of  seconds.

Full results
 1955 Kentucky Derby Charts

Payout Section 
$2.00 wager returns $7.60 profit, therefore $5.60 profit.

The win, place and show payoffs are based on a $2.00 bet.

Extra Information 
 Winning Breeder: Rex C. Ellsworth; (CA)
 Track rating: Fast

References

1955
Kentucky Derby
Derby
Kentucky
Kentucky Derby